Jimmy Gregg (born 1947) is an Irish former association football player during the 1960s and 1970s.

He made his Shamrock Rovers debut on the 20th of April 1966 . Sought a move away from Milltown in December 1971 to get first team football .

Made 4 appearances for the Hoops in the European Cup Winners' Cup including a win over FC Schalke 04 in 1969.

In the 1971/72 season his brother Eamonn Gregg played alongside him at Glenmalure Park.

Trivia
The Gregg name is synonymous with Shamrock Rovers. His two great uncles, 'Jemmer' (real name Michael James) and John were original founder members of the club and his uncle Podge (real name Patrick) won the FAI Cup with Rovers in 1945. His brother Eamonn Gregg also played for Rovers in the 1970s. Podge's son in law Mick Gannon won the FAI Cup with Rovers in 1978 and his son Karl Gannon also played for the Hoops in the 1990s.

Honours
FAI Cup
  Shamrock Rovers - 1968
League of Ireland Shield
  Shamrock Rovers - 1967/68
Leinster Senior Cup
  Shamrock Rovers - 1968/69
Blaxnit Cup
  Shamrock Rovers 1967/68

Sources 
 The Hoops by Paul Doolan and Robert Goggins

Republic of Ireland association footballers
Shamrock Rovers F.C. players
League of Ireland players
1947 births
Living people
Association footballers not categorized by position